Lehigh University is an American private research university located in Bethlehem, Pennsylvania. It was established in 1865 by businessman Asa Packer with a founding gift of $500,000. The President's Office is in the Alumni Memorial Building which is located on the west side of the Asa Packer Campus in South Side Bethlehem. The President's House is situated just a few meters to the southeast of the Alumni Memorial Building.

References

External links
 Past Presidents – Lehigh University.

Presidents of Lehigh University
Lehigh University